Hear Me Out (Chinese: 有话要说) is an info-ed programme produced by Channel 8 News & Current Affairs Department. It is hosted by popular host Bryan Wong and YES 933 FM DJ Lin Peifen.

Background
Hear Me Out is an infotainment TV talk show. Six notable guests from various sectors are invited to the programme to discuss about their work, and hear their insights into our life and times.

Series overview

Episodes

Season 1 (2014–2015)

Season 2 (2016)

Season 3 (2017)

Season 4 (2018)

Accolades

|-
! scope="row" rowspan="2" | 2015
| rowspan="2" | Star Awards 2015 Show 2  红星大奖2015 - 第二场
| Best Info-ed Programme Host 最佳资讯节目主持人
| Bryan Wong 王禄江 
| 
| 
|-
| Best Info-Ed Programme 最佳资讯节目 
|
| 
|
|}

See also
 Mediacorp Channel 8
 Channel 8 News

References

Current affairs shows
2014 Singaporean television series debuts
Channel 8 (Singapore) original programming